The first videos before the debut of webseries Extra Credits were released on YouTube by the series' co-creator Daniel Floyd. The show was then picked up by The Escapist for the first 54 episodes before a contractual dispute forced the show to leave and be picked up by PATV. Technical limitations with PATV's site forced the official episodes to be categorized in seasons of 26 episodes each since the move.

Beginning on January 1, 2014, episodes were posted exclusively on Extra Credits' YouTube channel.

YouTube-released episodes
This list deals with the videos released by Floyd under the loose title Video Games And...

Season 1

Season 2

Season 3

Season 4

Season 5

Season 6

Season 7

Post-Penny Arcade Episodes

Other Series

Extra Curricular
Extra Curricular is a series of Podcasts of a similar nature to the main video series.

Extra History

Overview

The table is sorted by start date and not the official S number. Several World War II titles are labelled S10.

The Punic Wars

The Seminal Tragedy

Warring States Japan: Sengoku Jidai

England: The South Sea Bubble

Africa: Zulu Empire I

Byzantine Empire: Justinian and Theodora

Europe: The First Crusade

Korea: Admiral Yi

England: The Broad Street Pump

Mary Seacole

World War II: The Battle of Kursk

Suleiman the Magnificent

WW2: The Resource War

Early Christian Schisms

First Opium War

The Brothers Gracchi

Hiawatha

The History of Paper Money

Simón Bolívar

Catherine the Great

Ned Kelly

The Articles of Confederation

Hunting the Bismarck

Kamehameha the Great

D-Day

The Bronze Age Collapse

Great Northern War

Otto von Bismarck

Khosrau Anushirawan

WW1 Christmas Truce

Cuban Missile Crisis

Genghis Khan

The Danelaw

The Empire of Mali

The History of Non-Euclidean Geometry

Thermopylae

1918 Flu Pandemic

Kingdom of Majapahit

Battle of Saipan

Quantum Computing

The Viking Expansion

Defense of Poland

Sun Yat-sen

Tuberculosis

Irish Potato Famine

Siege of Vienna

Queen Nzinga

The Three Kingdoms

History of England

Joan of Arc

The Inca Empire

History of Dentistry

Building Angkor

History of Space Travel

Policing London

The Haitian Revolution

Ibn Battuta

Dividing the Middle East

The Field of the Cloth of Gold

Exploring the Pacific

The Trojan War

Third Century Crisis

Syphilis

Cleopatra

End of the Samurai

Saladin

Teddy Roosevelt the Trustbuster

Jewish Pirates

One-Shots

James Recommends

Extra Remix

Design Club

Extra Sci-fi

References

Extra Credits